Puerta Jerez is a station of the Seville Metro on the line 1. It is also, a tram stop of the MetroCetro line. It is located at the intersection of Paseo de Cristina Av. and Almirante Lobo St., in the district of Casco Antiguo. Puerta Jerez is an underground station, so far, it is the nearest at historic centre of the city. This centric station is located between Plaza de Cuba and Prado de San Sebastián on the same line. It was opened on 16 September 2009.

Connections
Bus: 5, 30, 41, C3, C4, M-140, M-150, M-151, M-152, M-153 Tram: MetroCentro (T1)

See also
 List of Seville metro stations

References

External links 
 
 History, construction details and maps
 Satellite view from Google

Seville Metro stations
Railway stations in Spain opened in 2009